Angelica Sue Page (née Torn; February 17, 1964) is an American actress, director, producer and screenwriter. She is the only daughter of actors Rip Torn and Geraldine Page. Credited as Angelica Torn in her early career, she legally and professionally changed her name to Angelica Page in September 2011.

Page began her career as an understudy in the 1993 Broadway revival of Anna Christie, and made her feature film debut in Nobody's Fool (1994). In 1998, she starred in a Broadway production of Side Man, which earned her a Helen Hayes Award for Best Actress. She subsequently appeared in the films The Sixth Sense (1999), and the political drama The Contender (2000).

She continued to appear Off-Broadway throughout the 2000s, returning to Broadway with a supporting part in a 2012 revival of The Best Man. In 2015, she starred as her mother, Geraldine Page, in the touring stage production Turning Page, a biographical play which she also wrote. Additional film credits include Michael Imperioli's The Hungry Ghosts (2009), and the thriller Never Here (2017).

Early life
Page was born Angelica Torn on February 17, 1964, in New York City to actors Rip Torn and Geraldine Page. She was raised in New York City, and has noted that her parents' marriage was turbulent and marked by frequent fighting. Though she was encouraged by her mother to act, Page described herself as a "shy child" and was resistant to pursuing it. For a time, she had considered a career as a chef. Page attended the Bank Street School for Children in Manhattan.

After her mother's death in 1987, Page began exploring acting as a career option, as it had been her mother's "dying wish." She commented: "My mother died before she ever had a chance to see me realize this dream that she apparently had for me, but never spoke of. She wanted me to make my own decisions, but then at the end when she realized she didn't have any time left, she made me promise." Page studied acting at the William Esper Studio and HB Studios.

Career
Page's first professional role was on Broadway as an understudy in the 1993 revival of Eugene O’Neill's Anna Christie. She subsequently made her feature film debut in Nobody's Fool (1994), and appeared in several independent films before having a supporting role in M. Night Shyamalan's The Sixth Sense (1999). Also in 2000, she had a supporting role in Amos Kollek's Fast Food Fast Women (2000), and in the Academy Award-nominated political drama The Contender (2000). The following year, she had a supporting role as Patty opposite John Travolta in the thriller Domestic Disturbance (2001).

On stage, Page received the Helen Hayes Award (Best Actress 2000) for her work in the Tony Award-winning Side Man at the Kennedy Center. This followed closely after being honored with the New York People's Choice Award in the Best Supporting Actress category (1999) for her portrayal of Patsy, a role she originated for the same production.

Nominated for her second Helen Hayes Award (Best Actress 2010) for her portrayal of Ivy Weston in the Pulitzer Prize- and Tony Award-winning August: Osage County (Broadway and National Tour), her performance was heralded as "revelatory" by the Chicago Tribune. On television, she appeared as Julia Brinn in Law & Order: Special Victims Unit (2005); other television credits include Law & Order: Criminal Intent, The Sopranos, 100 Centre Street, and As the World Turns. In 2009, she had a supporting role in the Michael Imperioli-directed drama The Hungry Ghosts.

In 2015, Page developed the one-woman show Turning Page, a biographical play in which she portrayed her mother. The production opened in Los Angeles before touring nationally, and Charles McNulty of the Los Angeles Times praised it, writing: "For those who have been touched by Page's sorcery—and I personally don't know any great actor who hasn't been—Angelica's virtuosic conjuring of her mother's spirit is something to behold." The production continued to tour into 2017.

Other ventures
Page is a lifetime member of the Actors Studio and serves on its board of directors. Actively involved with the charities PAVE and Opening Act, she is developing a foundation for the arts to foster emerging artists in her mother's name.

Personal life
Page married Keith William Burkhardt in 1984, and with him gave birth to a son, Elijah (born 1985), and a daughter. The couple divorced in 1992. She subsequently married actor Tim Williams in 1998 after the two had met while performing in a 1996 stage production titled Strangers in the Land of Canaan, directed by her father. She married Dmitry Lipkin in 2017.

She had commented that she had a combative relationship with her father, stating: "He's a worthy adversary. He's a very strong personality. He's an amazing person, an amazing father, but sometimes there are certain things we don't see eye to eye on. I call him on it and we fight, just like anybody else."

As of 2018, Page resided in Los Angeles, California.

Filmography

Film

Television

Stage credits

References

External links

 
 

1964 births
Living people
20th-century American actresses
21st-century American actresses
Actresses from New York City
American film actresses
American stage actresses
American television actresses
American people of Austrian descent
American people of Czech descent
American people of German descent
American people of Moravian-German descent
Bank Street College of Education alumni
People from Manhattan